Fever Forms is the fifth studio album by American indietronica band The Octopus Project, released on July 9, 2013, on Peek-A-Boo Records.

Track listing

References

2013 albums
The Octopus Project albums
Peek-A-Boo Records albums